Lego Friends is a product range of Lego construction toys designed primarily for girls. Launched in 2012, the theme introduced "mini-doll" figures, which are about the same size as traditional Lego minifigures but are more detailed and realistic. The eight main characters of the theme are Aliya, Nova, Zac, Liann, Paisley, Leo, Autumn and Olly, replacing the original cast named Andrea, Olivia, Stephanie, Mia and Emma. The theme was relaunched in January 2023 to focus on a more diverse cast of characters.

Lego Friends sets depict scenes from suburban life set in the fictional town of Heartlake City and usually include one of the character's names in the titles. The sets are complemented by an animated series that premiered in 2012. The Friends product range replaced Lego's previous female-oriented theme Belville, which had been in production since 1994, and featured dolls that were much larger than both the mini-dolls and minifigures. The launch of Lego Friends in 2012 was one of Lego's biggest successes, as it not only doubled sales expectations, but also extensively widened Lego's customer base within the girls' sector. Despite receiving initial criticism relating to its representation of girls and their interests, the line has consistently performed well and has been regularly listed as one of The Lego Group's best selling themes.

Overview 
Lego Friends focuses on eight characters named Aliya, Nova, Zac, Liann, Paisley, Leo, Autumn and Olly who live in Heartlake City. These characters replaced the original five named Andrea, Olivia, Stephanie, Mia and Emma. Each of the characters has specific interests, such as animal-lover, beautician and pop star. The theme depicts their houses, hobbies, cars and favourite places to spend their free time. The line introduced the mini-doll figure in Lego Friends construction toy sets, replacing the traditional Lego minifigure. The mini-doll is slightly taller than a minifigure, thinner and curvier, and was an improvement on the Belville range, which did not have customisable figures. It is also compatible with the wider Lego product range. Lego Friends also introduced a range of new brick colours, including purple, lavender, teal and turquoise.

Characters

Original characters 
Prior to January 2023, Lego Friends focused on five teenage girls who live in the fictional town of Heartlake City. Each character had a distinctive personality, illustrated by her favourite activities.

 Andrea - a confident and charismatic singer who loves to perform. She has a pet bird which she calls Pepper. She also loves being the centre of attention and dreams of being a celebrity and a great singer of all.
 Emma - a creative and imaginative character who expresses herself through art. She has a cat for a pet which she calls Chico. She loves cheese a lot, is the silliest of the group and is shown to be smart.
 Mia - an animal lover who enjoys being outdoors. She has a pet rabbit which she calls Twister. She loves being sarcastic and will do anything to protect the wilderness.
 Olivia - a curious character with a passion for science. She is the smartest in the group and has a pet hamster whom she calls Rumble  and usually stays in the robot thingy that Olivia built to help out.
 Stephanie - a sporty character who loves health and fitness. She is the most competitive one in the group and will turn anything into a competition and has a pet dog whom she calls Dash.

2023 characters 
 Autumn - who likes to build a campfire, catch a fish and put up a makeshift shelter.
 Zac - a jokester. He likes motocross, martial arts and an extreme sports.
 Paisley - a singer who loves to perform.
 Leo - a cook and helping his grandma in the kitchen.
 Aliya - who likes to do homework, extra-curriculars and volunteering at the animal shelter.
 Nova - she has a pet dog whom she calls Pickle.
 Olly - a fashion designer.
 Liann - a famous comic book illustrator.

Development 
Before the launch of the Lego Friends range, The Lego Group had previously targeted both boys and girls in its marketing. An American commercial in 1955 depicted both young boys and young girls playing with Lego. In 1974, the Lego minifigure was introduced, with a female minifigure introduced two months after the male minifigures. By 1979, the company had begun to specifically target girls with the launch of Scala jewellery. In 1981, a young girl holding her Lego creation was showcased in a Lego advert. In 1994, the Belville product line was introduced for girls, which focused on a fairytale theme and did not include minifigures or buildable toys. Scala was later resurrected in 1997, which emphasised gender roles.

Lego Friends was launched following four years of research. In 2008, The Lego Group conducted research about its customer base, which showed that 90% of Lego sets sold were aimed at boys. This meant that there was a huge untapped market of girls who were not using Lego. A Lego spokesman, Michael McNally reported, "Seeing that the play pattern was really skewing so heavily toward boys, we wanted to understand why. We embarked on four years of global research with 4,500 girls and their moms. Some of the things we heard were really surprising and challenging in ways that weren't really comfortable for us as a brand." The research showed that boys and girls play very differently and construct different worlds of play. McNally noted that, "The boys immediately grabbed the figures and the horses and the catapults and they started having a battle". By contrast the girls were more focused on the structure. "They all looked around inside the castle and they said, 'Well, there's nothing inside'. This idea of interior versus exterior in the orientation of how they would then play with what they built was really interesting. If you think about most of the Lego models that people consider to be meant for boys, there's not a whole lot going on in there. But [the girls had] this idea of, 'There's nothing inside to do.'"

The Lego Friends line was developed to target the girl's market. The Lego Group conducted extensive ethnographic research, which aimed to identify girls' preferences. Mauricio Affonso, Friends model designer commented, "One of the main things was they couldn't really relate to the minifigure, it's too blocky. Boys tend to be a lot more about good versus evil, whereas girls really see themselves through the mini-doll. They wanted a greater level of detail, proportions and realism."

The research also showed a difference in the way that girls assemble Lego sets. McNally commented, "One of the things we learned in the research was that—where boys were perfectly happy going through two hours assembling a single structure—girls were much more interested in small bite-sized assembly that provided a role-play opportunity, before then building again".

Launch 
Lego Friends was launched in January 2012 in North America (December 2011 in France), with the release of 14 sets. The first wave included 23 sets and featured five friends named Andrea, Olivia, Stephanie, Mia, and Emma in suburban settings. In the initial release the larger sets included the Heartlake Vet, City Park Cafe, and Butterfly Beauty Shop. Smaller sets included Stephanie's Cool Convertible, Andrea's Stage, Olivia's Invention Workshop and Emma's Splash Pool.

Reception

Controversy 
The Lego Friends theme received initial criticism for its reinforcement of gender stereotypes. Campaign groups in both the UK and the US particularly disliked the use of the colour pink in the product range and the particular range of activities enjoyed by the characters. Abi Moore of UK campaign group, Pinkstinks remarked, "We want toys that offer all sorts of opportunities to all children. We think that cupcakes, parties and having everything revolve around leisure is just tiresome and heavily stereotyped." In the US a petition launched by the Spark movement achieved 50,000 signatures with the aim of pressuring The Lego Group to change its marketing strategy. In addition, the slim figures of the Friends characters have also drawn criticism from eating disorder specialists.  The Campaign for a Commercial-Free Childhood nominated Lego Friends for a TOADY award, which is a "worst toy" award that is an acronym for "Toys Oppressive And Destructive to Young Children", having opined that the Lego Friends line was "so jam-packed with condescending stereotypes it would even make Barbie blush". However, The Lego Group has responded to its critics by stating that the line was the result of research with 3,000 girls who wanted to find relevance in Lego construction sets.

Lego spokesman, Michael McNally commented, "There were a lot of people at the beginning who said, 'They’ve dumbed it down, it's not nearly as complicated [as the original Lego], it's special for girls because they don't think girls can build. The reality is, just about piece for piece, there are just as many pieces required to put something together [among Friends sets]." McNally defended the Lego Friends product line against its critics by stating, "I think there's been a lot of momentum around this idea that everything should be gender neutral. That's not what we're striving for. We don't see anything wrong with the natural ways that children are choosing to play. We try being gender inclusive."

In response to further criticism raised in a letter written by a 7-year-old girl in 2014 about the nature of the girls' activities in Lego sets, The Lego Group released a Research Institute play set, which included a female palaeontologist, astronomer and chemist.

Success 
Despite the controversy, Lego Friends is one of Lego's biggest successes. In 2012, when the Friends line was launched, the line doubled sales expectations, with sales to girls tripling in the same year. In the first six months of 2012, The Lego Group's net profit rose 35% to 2bn kroner (£213m) partially driven by the success of the Friends line. This success caused other construction-set companies such as Mega Blocks to introduce girl dolls. Following the launch of Lego Friends, sales in the girls' market were growing as much as 20 percent each year. Three years after the launch, Lego achieved sixth place in the list of gifts that girls wanted most for Christmas, according to a survey by the National Retail Federation. Lego Friends has also reappeared in The Lego Group's annual report as one of its five top selling themes, most recently in 2016, 2018, 2019 and 2020. Lego's chief operating officer, Bali Padda remarked, "We tried reaching into the girls' audience a number of times over the last 15, 20 years, and this is the first time, with Friends, that we've had true success". On 28 September 2022, The Lego Group reported that Lego Friends, alongside Lego Star Wars, Lego Technic, Lego Icons (formerly Creator Expert), Lego City and Lego Harry Potter were the top earning themes for the six months ending 30 June 2022.

Relaunch 
In October 2022, The Lego Group announced the relaunch of the brand, which introduced eight new characters in January 2023 named Aliya, Autumn, Leo, Zac, Liann, Olly, Paisley and Nova. The line up represents a new generation of characters accompanied by a new series. The Lego Group stated that it had been working with the Geena Davis Institute to present greater diversity. The new sets were launched on 1 January 2023. The new characters were created to offer greater representation by featuring a variety of skin tones, disabilities, cultures and neurodiversity.

Toy line

Construction sets 
Following the initial launch, Lego Friends sets have been released in waves and have expanded on the various interests of the characters and their friends. These have included various vocational, recreational and academic interests, such as agriculture, equestrianism, wildlife animal rescue and rehabilitation, and pop stardom. The range has also included suburbia-themed sets, as well as an amusement park and skiing theme. The largest sets since the original wave have been the Summer Riding Camp, Heartlake Shopping Mall and Heartlake Grand Hotel. According to Bricklink, there have been a total of 508 Lego Friends sets released since January 2012.

In 2018, the Lego Friends line announced some physical changes to the main characters, which according to The Lego Group, were made in response to feedback from children. The changes were made to make the characters "more diverse in their appearance" and add "more depth to their personality".

In 2020, The Lego Group partnered with National Geographic to release several construction sets that focused on environmental issues. The Lego Friends line launched construction sets that centred on animal protection. The sets included Baby Elephant Jungle Rescue, Jungle Rescue Base and Panda Jungle Tree House sets.

In 2021, Lego Friends launched a range of play cubes. Each cube includes a small brick build, a mini-doll and a pet animal, and is designed for ages 6+.

In April 2021, five sets were announced for release in summer 2021, including Forest Waterfall, Forest House, Heartlake City Grand Hotel, Tree House and Horse Training and Trailer.

In May 2021, Fenella Charity, design director and creative lead of Lego Friends discussed about Olivia's Electric Car set and explained, “LEGO Friends is grounded in the real world, so as designers we take our cues from what kids experience in their everyday lives,” and continued, “We have a responsibility to let kids experiment and learn about topics that they are interested in and celebrate and inspire kids on the way the world could be."

In September 2021, Matthew Ashton, The Lego Group's vice president of design announced that Lego Friends alongside City, Creator, Classic, Technic, Speed Champions, Monkie Kid, Ninjago, Collectible Minifigures and DOTS themes will continue until at least 2023.

On 3 January 2022, the Lego Friends brand celebrated its tenth anniversary. The Lego Group released eight new sets to celebrate a decade of friendship.

On 1 May 2022, The Lego Group partnered with NASA to release a construction set titled Olivia's Space Academy.

In May 2022, 12 new sets were announced for release in summer 2022, including Emma's Art School, Andrea's Theatre School, Stephanie's Sailing Adventure and Mia's Wildlife Rescue.

In August 2022, Lego Friends Advent Calendar was announced for release on 1 September 2022. The set contains 312 pieces with four mini-doll figures. The set includes Lego mini-doll figures of Santa, Olivia and two micro-dolls.

In October 2022, five new sets were announced for release on 1 January 2023, including Paisley's House, Dog Rescue Center, Heartlake Downtown Diner, Autumn's House and Heartlake International School.

Fusion 
Resort Designer was released on 1 September 2014 as part of the Lego Fusion theme. The set consists of 263 pieces, a Fusion capture plate and one mini-doll figure. It enables children to create a 2D house model by placing bricks on the Fusion capture plate, scanning with a smartphone or tablet and playing with the Lego Fusion Resort Designer app to unlock game levels. The set includes a mini-doll figure of Olivia. The Lego Fusion Resort Designer app includes game levels for the Lego Friends theme. The set was designed primarily for girls aged 7 to 12 years old.

Animated series, web shorts and TV specials 
An animated series and TV specials based on the Lego Friends theme have been released to accompany the product line. The story follows the adventures of the five friends in their hometown of Heartlake City. The toy line is also accompanied by a series of animated short films released on YouTube.

Series

Friends of Heartlake City 
Friends of Heartlake City is an animated television series that premiered on 3 November 2013. Each episode had a runtime of 25 minutes.

Friends: The Power of Friendship 
Lego Friends: The Power of Friendship aired on Netflix on 4 March 2016. The series includes two seasons with four episodes.

Friends: Girls on a Mission 
Friends: Girls on a Mission is a 2018 television series on Family Channel in Canada, on KidsClick and later Kabillion in the United States, Pop in the United Kingdom and Ireland, Super RTL in Germany, and TVNZ in New Zealand. The series premiered on 25 October 2018 and has continued for four seasons.

TV specials

Friends: Holiday Special 
Friends: Holiday Special is a 21-minute television special that premiered in YouTube on 6 November 2021.

Friends: Heartlake Stories 
In 2022, four TV specials for Friends: Heartlake Stories were released on YouTube, including Fitting In, Plight of the Bumblebee, Wet Wallop and The Final Countdown. Those shorts made their linear premiere on Disney Channel on August 21, 2022.

Friends The Next Chapter 
Friends The Next Chapter is a 44-minute television special that premiered in YouTube on 29 January 2023.

Critical reception 
The Lego Friends animated series has been praised for its positive role models and messaging, but criticised for its consumerism. Reviewer, Emily Ashby for Common Sense Media gave the series a two star rating, commenting that, "The characters are five strong, big-hearted teen girls who are good examples of the value of friendship. Social rivalry and other troubles arise in each story, but the girls overcome them in ways that celebrate cooperation, responsibility, and individuality." The review also opined that, "this somewhat plodding series feels more like an extended commercial than it does a solid contender for kids' attention".

Other media

Books 
In June 2012, two books based on the Friends theme were released. Lego Friends: Welcome to Heartlake City and Lego Friends: Perfect Pet Show were released on June 18, 2012, by DK. DK also released a Lego Brickmaster book based on the Friends theme on September 17, 2012.

Video games and apps

Lego Friends video game 

Lego Friends is a Lego-themed life simulation video game developed by Hellbent Games and published by Warner Bros. Interactive Entertainment, which is based on the Lego Friends theme. The game was first released for Nintendo 3DS systems on 12 November 2013, and for Nintendo DS systems on 8 April 2014. The game was later released for iOS devices on 31 July 2014.

Lego Friends Heartlake Rush 
Lego Friends Heartlake Rush is a 3D driving game that was developed by LEGO System A/S and is designed for children aged 4+. Players choose one of the Friends characters and navigate through a series of road obstacles. The game was released on iOS and Google Play.

Magazine 
In July 2014, the Lego Friends brand launched a monthly children's magazine, published by Immediate Media. Editions of the magazine were regularly published over the course of six and a half years, until it was discontinued with Issue 78. According to the Audit Bureau of Circulations (ABC), the magazine had achieved an average circulation of 22,468 between January and June 2020, which was lower than the Lego City magazine at 33,677 and the Lego Ninjago magazine at 54,423. The magazine had also received some controversy over its content in 2019, when a comic strip was criticised for sexist characterisation.

In January 2022, the Lego Friends magazine relaunched in the UK by Signature Publishing.

Theme park attractions 
In 2015, a Friends themed land was introduced to Legoland California, named Lego Friends Heartlake City, featuring a splash area, Lego models of the characters, a meet and greet area and a 15-minute live show. In the same year, a themed land was opened at Legoland Windsor Resort, featuring a live show and Heartlake City Express Train. Heartlake City also made its debut at Legoland Florida in May 2015, when a themed area of the park was launched featuring two attractions named Mia's Riding Adventure and Heartlake Mall theater. In November 2021, a Lego Friends themed land was announced for the upcoming launch of Legoland Shanghai Resort in 2024.

Film 
On 2 February 2016, Warner Brothers released a Lego Friends film on Blu-ray titled Lego Friends: Girlz 4 Life. The 2016 American Direct-to-DVD computer-animated film follows the story of popstar, Livi, who comes to Heartlake City. The Friends characters are forced to devise a plan when Livi's manager steals their hit song called Girlz.

The Lego Friends line made a prominent appearance in the 2019 film The Lego Movie 2: The Second Part, during scenes set within the SyStar System.

Awards and nominations 
In 2012, Olivia's House (set number: 3315) was awarded "DreamToys" in the Construction category by the Toy Retailers Association.

In 2013, Dolphin Cruiser was awarded "DreamToys" in the Granny Knows Best category by the Toy Retailers Association.

In 2013, Lego Friends was awarded "Toy of the Year" and also "Activity Toy of the Year" by the Toy Association.

In 2014, Heartlake Shopping Mall was awarded "DreamToys" in the Build The World category by the Toy Retailers Association.

In 2016, Amusement Park Roller Coaster was awarded "DreamToys" in the Action Station category by the Toy Retailers Association.

In 2017, the Lego Friends Amusement Park Roller Coaster was awarded "Toy of the Year" and "Construction Toy of the Year" by the Toy Association.

In 2019, Rescue Mission Boat was awarded "DreamToys" in the Trains, Planes and Automobiles category by the Toy Retailers Association.

In 2020, Jungle Rescue Base was awarded "DreamToys" in the Crafty Kids category by the Toy Retailers Association.

In 2021, Forest Camper Van and Sailboat was awarded "DreamToys" in the Everybody's Building category by the Toy Retailers Association.

In 2021, Heartlake City Shopping Mall (set number: 41450) was listed as one of the "Top 10 toys for Christmas 2021" by Tesco.

In 2023, Heartlake Downtown Diner (set number: 41728) was awarded "Hero Toy award" at London Toy Fair 2023.

See also 
 Belville (Lego)
 Lego Disney
 Lego Elves
 Lego DC Superhero Girls
 Lego Fusion
 Lego Juniors
 Lego Unikitty!

References

External links 
 Lego Friends at Lego.com

Friends
Products introduced in 2012
Netflix children's programming
Friends
Toy controversies